Philip Goff or Phillip Goff may refer to:

Phil Goff, New Zealand politician
 Philip Goff (philosopher), British philosopher
Phillip Atiba Goff, American psychologist